James Gottfried Frey (May 26, 1931 – April 12, 2020) was an American professional baseball manager, coach, general manager, and Minor League Baseball (MiLB) outfielder. In , Frey led the Kansas City Royals of Major League Baseball (MLB) to their first American League (AL) championship, in his first year with the team. In the World Series, they lost to the Philadelphia Phillies, who won their first World Series championship.

Early career
Frey was born in Cleveland, Ohio. He was attended Western Hills High School in Cincinnati, Ohio alongside his lifelong friend Don Zimmer. A left-handed batting-and-throwing outfielder, Frey spent much of his career in the farm systems of the Boston/Milwaukee Braves and St. Louis Cardinals.

Frey was promoted to the MLB Orioles' coaching staff under Earl Weaver, in 1970, and coached on three AL pennant winners and one World Series champion through 1979. Jim Palmer called him "one of the great fielder-mover-arounders of all time."

Kansas City Royals
A week after the end of the 1979 World Series on October 24, Frey was named to succeed Whitey Herzog as manager of the Kansas City Royals. He led the Royals to a 97–65 mark and the American League West Division title in 1980; then, in the 1980 American League Championship Series, the Royals swept their long-time postseason nemesis, the New York Yankees, in three straight games to capture the AL title. This served as some sort of revenge for the Yankees having defeated Herzog's Royals for three consecutive seasons (1976–78) in the ALCS. However, the Royals dropped the World Series to the Philadelphia Phillies in six games. Frey's use of seven pitchers for the whole Series led to short runs for their starters that meant they could not pitch efficiently despite batting .290 in the Series.

During the strike-marred 1981 season, in which the Royals finished the first half with a 20–30 record, Frey was criticized widely for not taking full advantage of a team built for speed and for failing to motivate his players by Kansas City vice president/general manager Joe Burke. Frey was relieved of his duties on August 31, despite the 10–10 ballclub leading the second-half American League West standings. His replacement was Dick Howser, who had lost his managerial job with the Yankees after the previous year's ALCS. Frey's record in just less than two seasons as Royals manager was 127–105.

Chicago Cubs
Frey then returned to the coaching ranks with the New York Mets for 1982–83. He was hired by the Chicago Cubs for the 1984 season, and again struck paydirt as the Cubs won the division title, earning their first post-season appearance since 1945. During the clubhouse celebration following the division-clinching in Pittsburgh, Frey declared, "The monkey's off our back!"

The Cubs won the first two games against the San Diego Padres in the National League Championship Series at Wrigley Field, before they went to San Diego needing to win just one of the next three games. The Cubs lost the next three games, and many critics blamed Frey for mishandling the pitching staff. Still, the 1984 Cubs are revered among Cubs fans. Ryne Sandberg cited Frey as "the one guy who was extremely instrumental in my career. He saw extra base hits and home runs for me that I didn’t see.”

After a trying 1985 season in which the entire five-man starting rotation simultaneously spent time on the disabled list, the Cubs sputtered in 1986. Frey was fired two months into the season and replaced by John Vukovich. The next year, Frey surfaced as a color commentator on the Cubs' WGN Radio broadcasts.

In December 1987, the Tribune Co. hired Frey to replace his old boss, general manager Dallas Green, who had resigned two months earlier. Frey hired his lifelong friend, Zimmer, to manage the team, and immediately made his presence felt. Within weeks of his hiring, Frey dealt relief pitcher Lee Smith to Boston for journeyman pitchers Al Nipper and Calvin Schiraldi, the latter of whom was best known for playing a part in the Red Sox' 1986 World Series collapse. Frey also traded the popular Keith Moreland to San Diego for closer Goose Gossage, who had played a big part on the Padres team that eliminated the Cubs, four years earlier. Neither move worked, and the Cubs were without a closer.

Frey made a bold move in the winter of 1988, trading budding star Rafael Palmeiro and young pitcher Jamie Moyer to the Texas Rangers for a number of players, including Mitch Williams. The trade appeared to pay off for the Cubs with respect to the 1989 season as Williams saved 36 games, the Cubs won a division title and Moyer and Palmeiro struggled in Texas. But Williams had just one more forgettable year for the Cubs before being traded to Philadelphia in 1991, and Palmeiro and Moyer went on to have productive careers. Following the 1989 campaign, Frey was named co-Executive of the Year by United Press International (UPI).

After a disappointing 1990 season, Frey was active on the free agent market, acquiring former Toronto Blue Jay and  American League MVP George Bell, former Cincinnati Reds starting pitcher Danny Jackson, and former Houston Astros closer Dave Smith. Jackson and Smith flopped in their roles in 1991, and Zimmer was fired – apparently on orders from Tribune Co. CEO Donald Grenesko, in May 1991. Jim Essian, a former journeyman catcher and Iowa Cubs manager, replaced Zimmer for the remainder of the season. Frey was reassigned within the organization after the 1991 season, replaced by former Chicago White Sox general manager Larry Himes. He left baseball in 1992, citing a feeling of being worn out after 43 years in the game.

Retirement and death
Later on, Frey became Vice Chairman of the Independent Somerset Patriots of the Atlantic League of Professional Baseball, being a key figure in the team's early years. He died in Ponte Vedra, Florida, on April 12, 2020, at the age of 88, survived by his wife of 68 years and his four children.

References

External links

Jim Frey at SABR (Baseball BioProject)
Jim Frey at Pura Pelota (Venezuelan Professional Baseball League)
Jim Frey at Baseball America Executive Database

1931 births
2020 deaths
American expatriate baseball players in Venezuela
Atlanta Crackers players
Austin Senators players
Baltimore Orioles coaches
Baltimore Orioles scouts
Baseball coaches from Ohio
Baseball players from Cleveland
Buffalo Bisons (minor league) players
Chicago Cubs announcers
Chicago Cubs executives
Chicago Cubs managers
Columbus Jets players
Evansville Braves players
Fort Worth Cats players
Hartford Chiefs players
Indios de Oriente players
Industriales de Valencia players
Jacksonville Braves players
Kansas City Royals managers
Lácteos de Pastora players
Leones del Caracas players
Major League Baseball broadcasters
Major League Baseball bullpen coaches
Major League Baseball first base coaches
Major League Baseball general managers
Major League Baseball hitting coaches
Manager of the Year Award winners
Minor league baseball managers
New York Mets coaches
Omaha Cardinals players
Paducah Chiefs players
Rochester Red Wings players
Toledo Sox players
Tulsa Oilers (baseball) players